Daniel Vincelette (born August 1, 1967) is a Canadian former professional ice hockey player who played in the National Hockey League (NHL) for the Chicago Blackhawks and Quebec Nordiques.

Biography
Vincelette was born in Verdun, Quebec. As a youth, he played in the 1979 Quebec International Pee-Wee Hockey Tournament with a minor ice hockey team from Acton Vale, Quebec.

Vincelette started his National Hockey League career with the Chicago Blackhawks in 1986. He also played for the Quebec Nordiques. He left the NHL after the 1992 season.

Career statistics

References

External links

1967 births
Living people
Atlanta Knights players
Canadian ice hockey left wingers
Chicago Blackhawks draft picks
Chicago Blackhawks players
Drummondville Voltigeurs players
Durham Wasps players
Halifax Citadels players
Indianapolis Ice players
People from Verdun, Quebec
Quebec Nordiques players
Saginaw Hawks players
San Diego Gulls (IHL) players
San Francisco Spiders players
Ice hockey people from Montreal